Maureen Patricia Lines (23 October 1937 – 17 March 2017), locally known as Bibi Dow of Kalash, was a British author, photographer, social worker and environmentalist who was known for her work on the Kalasha people.

Biography
Maureen Lines first visited Pakistan in 1980 and from then on spent her whole life in the preservation and promotion of Kalasha culture for which she was awarded the Tamgha-i-Imtiaz in 2008. She was co-founder of the Hindu Kush Conservation Association with Nicholas Barrington, the then British High Commissioner to Pakistan. She died in Peshawar at the age of 79 and was buried in the British cemetery.

Books
She wrote the following books:
Beyond the North-West Frontier: Travels in the Hindu Kush and Karakorams
Journey through Jalalabad
The Kalasha people of North-Western Pakistan
The Last Eden

References

British Christians
British environmentalists
British women environmentalists
British social workers
Writers from London
British emigrants to Pakistan
Naturalised citizens of Pakistan
Kalash culture
Recipients of Tamgha-e-Imtiaz
Pakistani Christians
Pakistani environmentalists
Pakistani women environmentalists
Pakistani social workers
Pakistani writers
1937 births
2017 deaths